Breathless may refer to:

Aircraft
Paradelta Breathless, an Italian paraglider design

Film and television
 Breathless (1960 film) (À bout de souffle), a French film directed by Jean-Luc Godard
 Breathless (1982 film), a Dutch film
 Breathless (1983 film), a remake of the 1960 film, starring Richard Gere
 Breathless (2008 film), a South Korean film directed by and starring Yang Ik-june
 Breathless (2012 film), an American film starring Gina Gershon
 "Breathless" (CSI: Miami), an episode
 Breathless (TV series), a British television period drama

Music
 Breathless (band), an English band
 Breathless, an American rock band led by Jonah Koslen

Albums
 Breathless (Camel album) or the title song, 1978
 Breathless (The Eyes of a Traitor album) or the title song, 2010
 Breathless (Kenny G album), 1992
 Breathless (Shankar Mahadevan album) or the title song, 1998
 Breathless (Shayne Ward album) or the title song (see below), 2007
 Breathless (Terence Blanchard album) or the title song, 2015
 , an EP by the Dan Reed Network, 1986

Songs
 "Breathless" (Corinne Bailey Rae song), 2007
 "Breathless" (The Corrs song), 2000
 "Breathless" (Jerry Lee Lewis song), 1958
 "Breathless" (Shayne Ward song), 2007
 "Calling" / "Breathless", by Arashi, 2013
 "Breathless", by Asking Alexandria from Reckless & Relentless, 2011
 "Breathless", by Better Than Ezra from Before the Robots, 2005
 "Breathless", by Cascada from Evacuate the Dancefloor, 2009
 "Breathless", by Dan Wilson from Free Life, 2007
 "Breathless", by Dio from The Last in Line, 1984
 "Breathless", by Figures on a Beach, 1984
 "Breathless", by Nick Cave and the Bad Seeds from Abattoir Blues / The Lyre of Orpheus, 2004
 "Breathless", by Quiet Riot from Metal Health, 1983
 "Breathless", by SPK from Digitalis Ambigua: Gold & Poison, 1987
 "Breathless", by Todd Rundgren from Something/Anything?, 1972
 "Breathless", by Viktor Lazlo from Viktor Lazlo, 1987
 "Breathless", by Waxahatchee from Ivy Tripp, 2015

Literature and fiction
 Breathless (novel), a 2009 novel by Dean Koontz
 Breathless (McDaniel novel), a 2009 young-adult novel by Lurlene McDaniel
 Breathless, a 1996 erotica short story collection by Kitty Tsui
 Breathless: The Scientific Race to Defeat a Deadly Virus, a 2022 book by David Quammen
 Breathless Mahoney, a fictional character in the comic strip Dick Tracy and related media

See also
 I'm Breathless, an album by Madonna
 Breathing, the process of taking oxygen in and carbon dioxide out of the body
 Dyspnea, shortness of breath, or breathlessness